Djorkaeff Néicer Reasco González (born 18 January 1999) is an Ecuadorian footballer who currently plays as a forward for Newell's Old Boys.

Personal life
He is named after Youri Djorkaeff and is the son of former Ecuadorian international footballer Néicer Reasco, who was playing for LDU Quito in the same game that Reasco Jr made his debut in.

Career statistics

Club

Notes

References

1999 births
Living people
Ecuadorian footballers
Ecuadorian expatriate footballers
People from Pichincha Province
Association football forwards
L.D.U. Quito footballers
C.D. Clan Juvenil footballers
Dorados de Sinaloa footballers
Newell's Old Boys footballers
Ecuadorian Serie A players
Ascenso MX players
Liga de Expansión MX players
Argentine Primera División players
Ecuadorian expatriate sportspeople in Mexico
Ecuadorian expatriate sportspeople in Argentina
Expatriate footballers in Mexico
Expatriate footballers in Argentina
2022 FIFA World Cup players